The Bulletin of Materials Science is a bimonthly peer-viewed scientific journal that publishes original research articles, review articles and rapid communications in all areas of materials science. It is published by Springer Science+Business Media on behalf of the Indian Academy of Sciences in collaboration with the Materials Research Society of India and the Indian National Science Academy. The editor-in-chief is Prof. Giridhar U Kulkarni (JNCASR).

Abstracting and indexing 
The journal is abstracted and indexed in:

According to the Journal Citation Reports, the journal has a 2020 impact factor of 1.783.

References

External links 
 

Springer Science+Business Media academic journals
Materials science journals
Bimonthly journals
Publications established in 1979
English-language journals